Hull York Medical School (HYMS) is a medical school in England which took its first intake of students in 2003. It was opened as a part of the British Government's attempts to train more doctors, along with Brighton and Sussex Medical School, Peninsula Medical School and University of East Anglia Medical School.

History

The early history of medical education in Hull and York goes back to the three following institutions: Hull Medical School (1831), York Medical Society (1832) and the York Medical School (1834). Notable doctors associated with the York school included John Hughlings Jackson (in whose honour the modern medical school building at the University of York is named), Daniel Hack Tuke, Thomas Laycock (physiologist), James Atkinson (surgeon), and Sir Jonathan Hutchinson. It is thought that the York school closed in the 1860s.

The founding of a medical school as part of the University of Hull was considered in the Report of the Royal Commission on Medical Education 1965–68 (Todd Report) (published 1968), but the idea was not thought viable until the Humber Bridge was completed, as it would enable students to travel to placements in South Lincolnshire.

Teaching

The medical school has 156 places for 2018 and receives around 1,200 applications each year. Of the successful applicants each year, half are based at the University of Hull and the other half are based at the University of York for the first two years of their course. In 2017, the medical school was ranked 17th in the UK by The Guardian University Subject Guide and 17th by the Complete University Guide 2018. For 2019 these rankings fell to 30th and 26th respectively.

 applicants are required to sit the UCAT admissions test.

Students spend the two years in phase one at their academic bases (either Hull or York). Phase two consists of rotation around York, Hull, Scunthorpe, Grimsby, Scarborough and Northallerton/Middlesbrough. In the final year of the course (phase three), students essentially take on the role of a 'junior' pre-registration house officer and are also able to carry out an 'elective' period overseas. This is a common feature in most UK medical curricula. The school's first international students began their studies in September 2006.

Hull York Medical School course uses problem-based learning. There is an emphasis on early and sustained clinical experience in General Practices, hospitals and community settings.

The medical school allows students to intercalate a BSc or master's degree in various subjects, such as anatomy, biology and ethics.

The medical degree curriculum is five years long and on completion students graduate with an MB BS degree (Bachelor of Medicine, Bachelor of Surgery).

Campuses, NHS Trusts and Hospitals
Hull York Medical School is based at two university sites, the University of Hull and University of York, and is partnered with 3  Acute NHS Trusts and 3 Mental Health Trusts.

Acute Trusts and Hospitals

Hull University Teaching Hospitals NHS Trust:
 Hull Royal Infirmary
 Castle Hill Hospital
Northern Lincolnshire and Goole Hospitals NHS Foundation Trust:
 Diana, Princess of Wales Hospital
 Scunthorpe General Hospital
York Teaching Hospital NHS Foundation Trust:
 York Hospital
 Scarborough General Hospital

Mental Health Trusts
 Rotherham Doncaster and South Humber NHS Foundation Trust
 Humber Teaching NHS Foundation Trust
 Tees, Esk and Wear Valleys NHS Foundation Trust

List of deans

Professor William Gillespie OBE (2003–2007)
Professor Ian Greer (2007–2010)
Professor Tony Kendrick (2010–2013)
Professor Trevor Sheldon (November 2013 - December 2016)
Professor Una Macleod (Dean from January 2017)

Staff

Professor John Lee, professor of Clinical Pathology was a co-presenter on Anatomy for Beginners (screened in the UK on Channel 4 in 2005) in which he explained the dissections of Gunther von Hagens. He co-presented a second series with von Hagens in 2006 called Autopsy: Life and Death (Channel 4, 2006).
He left the medical school in 2014.

References

External links

The Hull York Medical School
Discussion forum for applicants to Hull York Medical School

Medical schools in England
Education in Kingston upon Hull
University of Hull
University of York
2003 establishments in England
Educational institutions established in 2003
Departments of the University of York